Black & White Records was an American record company and label founded by Les Schreiber in 1943. It specialized in jazz and blues. When the label was sold to Paul and Lillian Reiner, it moved from New York City to Los Angeles. The catalog included music by Art Hodes, Cliff Jackson, Lil Armstrong, Barney Bigard, Wilbert Baranco, Erroll Garner, Jack McVea, and Willie "The Lion" Smith.

Ralph Bass was the recording director. The name was chosen to indicate that black and white musicians were signed to the label.

Early days
Black & White Records was founded in 1943 by Les Schreiber (1901–1965), and was located at 2117 Foster Avenue, Brooklyn, New York. The company initially issued recordings by Art Hodes and Cliff Jackson.

In 1945, Paul Reiner (6 December 1905, Hungary–1 February 1982, Los Angeles) and his wife, Lillian ( Drosd; 28 April 1908, Massachusetts–4 September 1982, Los Angeles), purchased the company, moved it to Los Angeles, and hired Ralph Bass to be recording director. Soon after that, Schreiber worked for Swan Records but left Swan around October 1946. Paul Reiner was president, his wife was vice president, Samuel Madiman was treasurer, and Larry Newton was sales manager.

Bass oversaw two of the most important records in the early evolution of rock and roll: "Stormy Monday" by T-Bone Walker (1946) and a rare crossover hit, "Open the Door, Richard" by Jack McVea (1947). In 1948, Bass left Black & White to start Bop Records.

Sales and agreements
Comet Records, owned by Les Schreiber, was sold to Black & White Records not long after their third recording session (with Red Norvo and Charlie Parker).

On August 11, 1947, B&W Records and Jewel Records (not to be confused with Je–Wel) entered a distribution agreement that gave B&W an option to acquire Jewel. Reiner retained his post as president of B&W while Ben Pollack, Jewel's president, entered as general manager of B&W's West Coast operations, overseeing the A&R department. Reiner moved his headquarters east and centered his operations on Chicago to strengthen the label's Midwestern distribution. The catalogues of B&W and Jewel were merged as a result of the deal. Pollack brought 10 unreleased masters and Martha Davis and Marion Morgan. Pollack also had a contract with Boyd Raeburn stipulating that the orchestra could record for a major label, but Jewel held an exclusive on all independent releases. The deal also increased the number of race records, i.e. records made by blacks that were marketed to blacks.

The first recording of "Open the Door, Richard" by Jack McVea was recorded on this label. Lena Horne recorded for this label in 1946 and 1947. Although they were novices in the business and were not specializing in rhythm and blues (R&B), they made a significant contribution, largely through the efforts of Bass, who recorded Roosevelt Sykes and T-Bone Walker.

In March 1949, Newton left B&W as sales manager to become general manager of Peak Records. Moses Asch replaced him as sales manager at B&W. Around that same time in 1949, Newton, while operating Derby, started Central Records with Lee Magid, and Treat Records in New York City; worked with Impulse! Records, became president of ABC-Paramount Records in 1965, and ran Crossover Records (founded in 1973 by Ray Charles).

Masters
On October 8, 1949, after shutting down B&W Records, Paul Reiner offered several hundred masters for sale, some released, some not. He appointed Al Katz (Katzenberger) to negotiate sales on his behalf. The sale was offered in units, ordered by artists. Katz gave first right of refusal to the artists.

Reiner had sold the masters from sessions by Art Tatum, Cyril Nathaniel Haynes, and Red Norvo/Charlie Parker to Ross Russell, the owner of Dial Records. The deal was closed via telephone on June 21, 1949.

Capitol Records bought the Black & White masters of T-Bone Walker in 1949 and gave the titles new matrix numbers. Capitol then issued 16 tracks on 8 individual 78rpm shellac disks (10 previously unreleased masters and 6 reissued masters) in 1949 through 1950. Capitol also put out a 10" LP consisting of 8 of these 16 tracks in 1953, titled T-Bone Walker: Classics in Jazz (Capitol H-370).

Black & White was one of the first companies to issue 12-inch 78 rpm discs in unbreakable material.

Cover version controversy
In 1948, Supreme Records recorded in Los Angeles and released "A Little Bird Told Me," written by Harvey Oliver Brooks (1899–1968), sung by Paula Watson (1927–2003), who is African American, accompanied by guitarist Mitchell "Tiny" Webb, and others. Her version spent 14 weeks on Billboards R&B charts in 1948 and 1949, reaching number 2 on the R&B charts and number 6 on the pop charts. In 1948, Decca released a cover version, sung by Evelyn Knight (1917–2007), who was white. Knight copied Watson's singing to the degree that it fooled musical experts brought into court as witnesses. Knight was accompanied by a band that included Walter Page on bass, the Stardusters (vocal group), and Johnny Parker (vocal and hand-clapping). Supreme claimed that Decca had stolen aspects of its original recording, including its arrangement, texture, and vocal style. Race was not an issue in the case, but the case served as an example of white performers covering the work of black artists in the 1950s.

The court ruled in favor of the defense, upholding a ruling that musical arrangements are not copyrightable property – individual interpretations or arrangements of a given style could not be protested under the law. This case opened the door for cover versions. In the 1950 ruling Supreme Records, Incorporated, a small label owned by Al Patrick (Albert T. Patrick; 1910–1973), who was African American, lost the case in United States District Court for the Central District of California, Southern Division, against Decca Records, Inc., a large record label.

Black & White Record Distributors, Inc. had been one of the two original plaintiffs but withdrew on a motion by the defendant, leaving Supreme as the sole plaintiff. Black & White participated in the case because it had been the manufacturer and distributor of Supreme's line.

Separately from the "Little Bird" case, Supreme had sued Black & White, contending that B&W had no right to turn over its line to two Canadian firms, Monogram and Dominion, who had been pressing and distributing in Canada. On April 2, 1949, Supreme & B&W settled their dispute out of court.

Supreme was soon out of business, and by December 1949, Paula Watson was working for Decca.

Black & White Records had a publishing subsidiary, Paul Reiner Publishing Company.

Employees 
 Ralph Bass (1911–1997), producer
 Bruce Altman, formerly of American Recording Artists (A.R.A.) Records
 John Blackburn
 Mack (aka Mac or Max) Green (né Mordecai Green; 1901–1979), manager (replaced John Blackburn, February 1949)

Artist roster

 Eduardo Abreu
 Buzz Adlam
 Ernestine Allen
 Ivie Anderson
 Lil Armstrong
 Wilbert Baranco
 Barney Bigard
 June Brewer
 Ramon Bruce
 Red Callender
 Gaylord Carter
 Dick Cary
 Buck Clayton
 Zeke Clements
 Rod Cless
 Clover Leaf Jubilee Quartet
 Vic Corwin
 Maxwell Davis
 Nick De Lano
 Phil De Vorn
 Hank Duncan
 Estelle Edson
 Jo Evans
 Four Aces
 Sammy Franklin
 Jan Garber
 Erroll Garner
 Al Gayle
 Maggie Hathaway & Her Bluesmen 
 Cyril Haynes
 Bob Hayward
 Shifty Henry (aka John Willie Henry)
 Bennie Hess (with The Texas Dandies aka Tex Williams' Western Caravan)
 Hip Chicks †
 Art Hodes
 Lena Horne
 Helen Humes
 The Original Hurtado Brothers & Their Royal Marimba Band
 Cliff Jackson
 Nat Jaffe
 Cee Pee Johnson
 Etta Jones
 Ralph Bass' Junior Jazz at the Auditorium ‡
 Linda Keene
 Al Killian
 Henry King 
 Dick Lane
 Al Lerner
 Ella Logan
 Mike Loscalzo
 Joe Marsala
 Jeannie McKeon
 McNeil Choir
 Jack McVea
 Oklahoma Ed Moody
 Sister Etta Mooney
 Phil Moore
 Buck Nation (with The Six Westernaires)
 Chino Oritz 
 Will Osborne
 Oscar Pettiford
 Alton Redd
 Lucius "Mushmouth" Robinson
 Al Sack
 St. Paul Choir Of Chicago
 Allen Schrader
 Gene Schroeder
 John Sellers
 Charlie Shavers
 Fiddlin' Arthur Smith
 Willie "The Lion" Smith
 Cactus Andy (aka Andrew Soldi from Tex Williams' Western Caravan)
 Rudy Sooter
 Earle Spencer
 Tim Spinosa
 Spirits of Rhythm
 Ray Stokes
 Roosevelt Sykes
 Rabon Tarrant
 Kay Thomas
 Tommy Todd
 T. Texas Tyler (with The Six Westernaires)
 Charlie Ventura
 T-Bone Walker
 Annette Warren
 Artie Wayne
 George Wettling
 Lariese Williams
 Eileen Wilson
 Gawdalike
 Gerald Wilson

 Maggie Hathaway & Her Bluesmen
 Ramon LaRue, piano
 Teddy Bunn (Theodore Leroy Bunn), guitar
 Julius Gilmore, bass
 Samuel E. Joshua, drums

† Hip Chicks (all female band)
 Marjorie Hyams (vibraphone)
 L'Ana Hyams (tenor sax;  Alleman; 1912–1997), bandleader married to Marjorie's brother: jazz pianist Mark Hyams (1914–2007), was formerly married to jazz guitarist Jimmy Webster (1908–1978).
 Jean Starr (trumpet)
 Vicki Zimmer (piano)
 Marian Gange (guitar)
 Cecilia Zirl (bass)
 Rose Gottesman (drums)
  special guest:
 Vivien Garry (vocal)
Ralph Bass' Junior Jazz at the Auditorium were recordings of jam sessions held by Bass in Compton, California, at teenage/college functions with name jazz musicians brought in as guests. The first live recording session was on August 26, 1946, and included Howard McGhee (tp), Les Robinson (as), Jack McVea (ts), Lucky Thompson (ts), Jimmy Bunn (p), Irving Ashby (g), Red Callender (b), and Jackie Mills (d). Also participating were Slim Gaillard, Les Paul, Nick Fatool, and Ivie Anderson. Bass hosted these sessions, in part, to help fight juvenile delinquency.

See also 
 List of record labels

Notes

References
 "Open the Door, Richard" (lyrics)
 "Open the Door, Richard" (notes to Jack McVea arrangement)
 "Small Label Gems of the Forties" (liner notes), by Dieter Salemann, Vol. 2, Solid Sender, Germany SOL513 (1980)

Inline citations

Citations from Billboard magazine

External links
Black & White Records on the Internet Archive's Great 78 Project

Record labels established in 1945
Blues record labels
Defunct record labels of the United States
Jazz record labels